Nevada's 4th congressional district is a congressional district that was created as a result of the 2010 United States Census. Located in the central portion of the state, it includes most of northern Clark County, southern Lyon County, most of Lincoln County, a sliver of Churchill County and all of Esmeralda, Mineral, and Nye counties. 

Although the district appears rural, over 80% of its population lives in the heavily Democratic northern portion of Clark County. As a result, the district leans Democratic.

The district has flipped between Democratic and Republican representation since it was created. Democrat Steven Horsford won the election for this seat in the 2012 House elections. He was seated for the 113th U.S. Congress in 2013 as the district's first congressman, serving just one term before he was defeated by Republican Cresent Hardy in November 2014. In turn, Hardy lost to Democrat Ruben Kihuen in 2016. Kihuen did not run for reelection in 2018, and the seat was won by Horsford in a rematch against Hardy.

Presidential voting
Election results from presidential races:
Results Under Current Lines (Since 2023)

Results Under Old Lines (2013-2023)

List of members representing the district

Election results

2012

2014

2016

2018

2020

2022

References

4
Clark County, Nevada
Lyon County, Nevada
Esmeralda County, Nevada
Lincoln County, Nevada
Mineral County, Nevada
Nye County, Nevada
White Pine County, Nevada
Constituencies established in 2013
2013 establishments in Nevada